The 30th Annual Tony Awards was held at the Shubert Theatre on April 18, 1976, and broadcast by ABC television. Hosts were Eddie Albert, Richard Burton, Jane Fonda, Diana Rigg, George C. Scott and Trish Van Devere.

The ceremony
Presenters: Alan Arkin, Clifton Davis, Bonnie Franklin, Celeste Holm, Cloris Leachman, Michele Lee, Jerry Lewis, Hal Linden, Mary Martin, Mike Nichols, Christopher Plummer, Vanessa Redgrave, Marlo Thomas, Leslie Uggams.

The theme of the show was "The Ones That Got Away", a medley of memorable songs from past musicals that did not win the Tony performed by Linden, Davis, Lee and Uggams with Richard Burton performing the number from Camelot.

The medley included songs from:

 Annie Get Your Gun
 High Button Shoes
 Where's Charley?
 Miss Liberty
 Call Me Madam
 Paint Your Wagon
 Wish You Were Here
 Can-Can
 Peter Pan
 Mr Wonderful
 Bells Are Ringing
 West Side Story
 Flower Drum Song
 Gypsy
 Camelot
 Milk And Honey
 Stop the World – I Want to Get Off
 Funny Girl
 Do I Hear a Waltz?
 Sweet Charity
 Walking Happy
 How Now, Dow Jones
 Hair
 Purlie
 The Rothschilds
 Grease
 Pippin
 Gigi
 Shenandoah

Musicals represented: 
 A Chorus Line ("I Hope I Get It"/"One" - Company)
 Bubbling Brown Sugar ("Sweet Georgia Brown" - Vivian Reed, Lonnie McNeil, Newton Winters)
 Chicago ("All I Care About" - Jerry Orbach and Company)
 Pacific Overtures ("Advantages of Floating in the Middle of the Sea" - Mako and Company)

Winners and nominees
Source:BroadwayWorld
 
Winners are in bold

Special awards
Lawrence Langner Award Winner (Lifetime Achievement in Theatre) - George Abbott
Regional Theatre Award - The Arena Stage, Washington, D.C. (This award takes note of the company's balanced program of distinguished revivals and a broad spectrum of new works and American premieres of important foreign plays.)
Mathilde Pincus, for outstanding service to the Broadway musical theatre
Thomas H. Fitzgerald, to the gifted lighting technician of countless Broadway shows and many Tony telecasts. (Posthumous)
Circle in the Square, for twenty-five continuous years of quality productions.
Richard Burton

Multiple nominations and awards

These productions had multiple nominations:

12 nominations: A Chorus Line
11 nominations: Chicago  
10 nominations: Pacific Overtures
3 nominations: Bubbling Brown Sugar, Knock Knock, Lamppost Reunion, The Royal Family, Travesties, Trelawny of the 'Wells' and Very Good Eddie 
2 nominations: Mrs. Warren's Profession, My Fair Lady, The Robber Bridegroom and They Knew What They Wanted

The following productions received multiple awards.

9 wins: A Chorus Line  
2 wins: Pacific Overtures and Travesties

See also
 Drama Desk Awards
 1976 Laurence Olivier Awards – equivalent awards for West End theatre productions
 Obie Award
 New York Drama Critics' Circle
 Theatre World Award
 Lucille Lortel Awards

References

External links
Tony Awards Official Site

Tony Awards ceremonies
1976 in theatre
Tony
1976 theatre awards
1976 in New York City
1970s in Manhattan